Lycée Montaigne may refer to:

 Lycée Montaigne (Paris)
 Lycée Montaigne (Bordeaux)
 Lycée Montaigne de N'Djamena in Chad

See also
 Montaigne (disambiguation)